Phalonidia affinitana, the large saltmarsh conch or large saltmarsh bell, is a species of moth of the family Tortricidae, the subfamily Tortricinae, and the tribe Cochylini. It is found in China (Liaoning, Tianjin, Xinjiang), Japan, Korea, Russia and most of Europe. Its habitat consists of salt marshes.

Adults are on wing from June to August in western Europe. The larvae feed on the flowers of Aster tripolium. Larvae can be found feeding on the flowers from July to August. In September, they bore down the flower stalk and stem to the rootstock. It overwinters in the roots and pupates in March, either in the roots or in debris.

Description 
The wingspan is 11–14 mm. The forewings are elongate and the costa gently arched. The  ground colour is light brownish-ochreous, submetallic and strigulated with fuscous. There is a slender straight brownish antemedian fascia parallel to the termen and interrupted beneath the costa and a dark fuscous dorsal dot or small spot before the tornus. The hindwings are grey. The larva is whitish, dorsally greyish - tinged; spiracular line faint, grey; head brown; plate of 2 black.

For a key to the terms used, see Glossary of entomology terms.

Similar species

Subspecies
Phalonidia affinitana affinitana
Phalonidia affinitana tauriana (Kennel, 1899)

References

Moths described in 1846
Phalonidia